Khanapur Assembly seat is one of the 224 assembly constituencies in the state of Karnataka in India. It is one of the 8 constituencies which make up Uttara Kannada (Lok Sabha constituency). It has been a stronghold of Maharashtra Ekikaran Samiti (MES) whose candidates tend to contest as independents because it is not officially recognized as a party. In 1962, MES did contest the election under its own official name.

Members of Assembly 
 1957: Laxman Balaji Birje (MES/IND, Mysore State Assembly)
 1962: Laxman Balaji Birje (MES)
 1967: Nilkanth Sardesai (MES / IND)
 1972: Nilkanth Sardesai (MES / IND)
 1978: Nilkanth Sardesai (MES / IND)
 1983: Patil Vasantrao Parashram (IND)
 1985: Patil Vasantrao Parashram (IND)
 1989: Vithalrao Yashwantrao Chavan (IND)
 1994: Ashok Narayan Patil (IND)   
 1999: Ashok Narayan Patil (IND)
 2004: Digambar Yashwantrao Patil (IND)
 2008: Pralhad Remani (BJP)
 2013: Arvind Chandrakant Patil (Independent) 
 2018: Anjali Nimbalkar (Congress)

Election results

1962 Election 
 Laxman Balaji Birje (MES) : 25,162 
 Rohinibai Pandurang Wagale (INC) : 14,614

1967 Election 
 Sardesai, Nilkanth Bhagwantrao (IND) : 21,281 votes 
 T. K. Ningappa (INC) : 14,490

1972 Election 
 Sardesai N B (IND/MES) : 23,081 votes  
 B. B. Veerabhadrappa (NCO) : 10,674

1978 Election 
 Sirdesai Nilkanthrao Bhagawantrao (IND / MES) : 16,610 votes
 Babshet Krishna Ji Ramchandra  JNP	13595

2013 Election 
 Arvind Chandrakant Patil (IND) : 37,055 votes 
 Rafique Khatalsab Khanapuri (INC) : 20903

2018 Election 
 Dr. Anjali Nimbalkar (INC) : 36,649 votes 
 Vithal Halagekar (BJP) : 31,516

See also
Belagavi district
List of constituencies of Karnataka Legislative Assembly

References

Assembly constituencies of Karnataka